Qeshlaq-e Abd ol Karim (also Romanized as Qeshlāq-e ‘Abd ol Karīm) is a village in Khondab Rural District, in the Central District of Khondab County, Markazi Province, Iran. At the 2006 census, its population was 275, in 50 families.

References 

Populated places in Khondab County